Steyrermühl is a village (Ortsteil), part of Laakirchen in Gmunden District, Upper Austria, Austria.

References

Cities and towns in Gmunden District